Church  is a Metropolitan Borough of Sefton ward in the Bootle Parliamentary constituency that covers the localities of Seaforth and Waterloo. The population of the ward as taken at the 2011 census was 12,068.

Councillors
 indicates seat up for re-election.
 indicates by-election.

Election results

Elections of the 2020s

Elections of the 2010s

References

Wards of the Metropolitan Borough of Sefton